Events from the year 1899 in Sweden

Incumbents
 Monarch – Oscar II
 Prime Minister – Erik Gustaf Boström

Events

 4–7 September - Kooperativa Förbundet is founded
 The Bus is introduced in Stockholm
 Åhléns
 Aurora (newspaper)
 Christian Workers Union of Sweden (1899)
 Djurgårdens IF Fotboll
 IFK Strängnäs
 IFK Kristianstad
 IFK Malmö Bandy
 IFK Malmö Fotboll
 Nässjö IF
 Reymersholms IK
 SoIK Hellas
 Stockholm Music Museum
 Svenska Fotbollpokalen
 Swedish Sailors and Coalers Union
 Swedish Workers Union
 A delegation from the Fredrika Bremer Association presented a suggestion of women's suffrage to prime minister Erik Gustaf Boström. The delegation was headed by Agda Montelius, accompanied by Gertrud Adelborg, who had written the demand. This was the first time the Swedish women's movement themselves had officially presented a demand for suffrage.

Births

 23 April – Bertil Ohlin, economist and politician (died 1979)

Deaths
 12 January – Clara Bonde, courtier (born 1806)
 30 March – Selma Jacobsson, photographer (born 1841)
 27 August  – Wendela Hebbe, reporter, often called the first female reporter of her country (born 1808)
 30 December – Axel Danielsson, socialist agitator (born 1863)
 Fredrique Paijkull, pioneer for the women's folk school in Sweden (born 1836)
 Karin Åhlin, educator (born 1830)
 Wilhelmina Bonde, courtier (born 1817)

References

 
Years of the 19th century in Sweden
Sweden